Democratic National Committee v. Russian Federation, et al. was a civil lawsuit filed by the Democratic National Committee (DNC) in the United States District Court for the Southern District of New York against the Russian Federation, WikiLeaks and other entities and individuals. The case, relating to Russian interference in the 2016 United States elections, was filed on April 20, 2018. The DNC's complaint accused the Trump campaign of engaging in a racketeering enterprise in conjunction with Russia and WikiLeaks. The American Civil Liberties Union, Reporters Committee for Freedom of the Press and others filed friend-of-the-court briefs expressing concern over the lawsuit's implications for freedom of the press.

Judge John G. Koeltl presided over the case, prior to dismissing it with prejudice on July 30, 2019. In dismissing the case, Judge Koeltl wrote that holding WikiLeaks liable for the publication of DNC emails would endanger press freedom, and that the Russian Federation enjoys sovereign immunity.

Defendants
Named as defendants in the lawsuit are the Russian Federation; the General Staff of the Armed Forces of the Russian Federation (GRU); the GRU operative using the pseudonym "Guccifer 2.0"; Aras Iskenerovich Agalarov; Emin Araz Agalarov; Joseph Mifsud; WikiLeaks; Julian Assange; the Trump campaign (formally "Donald J. Trump for President, Inc."); Donald Trump, Jr.; Paul Manafort; Roger Stone; Jared Kushner; George Papadopoulos; Richard W. Gates; and unnamed defendants sued as John Does 1–10. The U.S. government has concluded that the GRU, the Russian military intelligence service, was responsible for hacking into the DNC's servers in 2016 and leaking emails to WikiLeaks, which published them.

Motions 
A pre-motion conference was held on September 13, 2018. On October 3, the DNC filed an amended complaint. On December 6–7, defendants Rick Gates, George Papadopoulos, Aras and Emin Agalarov, Jared Kushner, Roger Stone, and the Trump campaign, all filed motions to dismiss the amended complaint, arguing inter alia that the plaintiff did not allege that they participated in the hacking or dissemination of the stolen information. On December 7, WikiLeaks also filed a motion to dismiss the case on other grounds, notably the First Amendment and lack of jurisdiction. The complaint was further amended on January 18, 2019, which defendants again moved to dismiss on March 4, 2019. Attorneys for WikiLeaks also filed a motion to dismiss the second amended complaint on that day. Plaintiff formally opposed those motions on April 18, 2019.

Dismissal 
The suit was dismissed with prejudice on July 30, 2019, meaning it had a substantive legal defect and could not be refiled. In his judgement, Judge John Koeltl wrote that even if the Russian government were involved in the hacking, US federal law generally prohibits suits against foreign governments. As for the various other defendants, the judge wrote that they "did not participate in any wrongdoing in obtaining the materials in the first place" and therefore had the First Amendment right to publish the information. Koeltl denied the Trump campaign defendants' motion for sanctions.

Commentary 
The suit has been compared to the DNC's 1972 suit against Richard Nixon's Committee to Re-elect the President in connection with the Watergate scandal; that suit was settled in 1974 on the day Nixon resigned from office. The DNC chose not to reveal how much the lawsuit would cost.

The group of defendants named in the DNC lawsuit overlaps with the group of people who have been investigated in connection with the probe led by Special Counsel Robert Mueller. Gates pleaded guilty to charges brought by Mueller in February 2018 and cooperated in the investigation, while Manafort has been charged and has pleaded not guilty. Aras and Emin Agalarov, who are also named as defendants in the lawsuit, are a father-and-son pair of Russian businessmen who hosted Trump's Miss Universe 2013 Pageant in Moscow and who were involved in planning a June 9 2016 meeting at Trump Tower between Donald Trump Jr. and a Russian lawyer "at which Donald Trump Jr. had expected to be given damaging information" about Democratic presidential nominee Hillary Clinton.

In a tweet following the decision, Trump Sr. called it "vindication & exoneration from the Russian, WikiLeaks and every other form of HOAX perpetrated by the DNC, Radical Democrats and others."

See also
List of lawsuits involving Donald Trump

References

External links
 Full Complaint
 Docket
2018 in United States case law
Democratic National Committee
Democratic Party (United States) litigation
Russian interference in the 2016 United States elections
United States District Court for the Southern District of New York cases
Legal cases involving WikiLeaks